Ried in der Riedmark is a municipality in the district of Perg in the Austrian state of Upper Austria.

Geography
Ried lies in the Mühlviertel. About 19 percent of the municipality is forest, and 71 percent is farmland.

References

Cities and towns in Perg District